Greatest Hits Volume Two is the second compilation album by American country music artist George Strait, released on September 7, 1987 by MCA Records. It features all of Strait's singles from 1984–87. It reached No. 1 on the Billboard Top Country Albums Chart and is certified triple platinum by the RIAA.

Track listing

Charts

Weekly charts

Year-end charts

References

1987 greatest hits albums
Albums produced by Jimmy Bowen
George Strait compilation albums
MCA Records compilation albums